Torstein Kristen Fossan Jøssang (born 31 October 1933) is a Norwegian physicist.

He was born in Jørpeland. He took the cand.real. at the University of Oslo in 1962 and took the dr.philos. degree at the same institution in 1968, following a research tenure at Ohio State University from 1963 to 1966. He has also been a guest scholar in Shenyang, Tel Aviv, Gainesville, Florida and Ponca City, Oklahoma.

He became an associate professor of physics at the University in Oslo in 1969 and professor in 1987. He has cooperated closely with physicist Jens Feder. He led the Norwegian Academy of Science and Letters' Centre for Advanced Study from 1993 to 2000, and has edited the Royal Swedish Academy of Sciences journal Physica Scripta.

He is a fellow of the Norwegian Academy of Science and Letters and the Académie Européenne des Sciences, des Arts et des Lettres.

He resides at Blommenholm.

References

1933 births
Living people
People from Strand, Norway
University of Oslo alumni
Academic staff of the University of Oslo
Norwegian physicists
Members of the Norwegian Academy of Science and Letters